The Bărăgan deportations were a large-scale action of penal transportation, undertaken during the 1950s by the Romanian Communist regime. Their aim was to forcibly relocate individuals who lived within approximately 25 km (15 miles) of the Yugoslav border (in present-day Timiș, Caraș-Severin, and Mehedinți counties) to the Bărăgan Plain. The deportees were allowed to return after 1956.

Reasons
After relations deteriorated between Romania and Yugoslavia, which was excluded from the Cominform in 1948, the border between the two states became a sensitive area for Bucharest (see Informbiro period). The ethnic minorities present there, especially in the Banat, were considered "elements with a heightened risk factor". Following the Soviet model of the Gulag, on March 15, 1951 the Ministry of Interior of the Romanian People's Republic issued the following decree:

The Ministry of Interior will be able, through a decision, to order the removal from population centres of any persons whose presence in those centres is unjustified, as well as the removal of those from any locality who, through their actions before the working people, endanger the construction of socialism in the Romanian People's Republic. For those in question obligatory residences can be set up in any locality.

The decree created favourable conditions for the implementation of the previously-planned deportations. This was to be the second mass deportation following the overthrow of Ion Antonescu, after the January 1945 deportation of over 30,000 ethnic Germans to the Soviet Union, during the closing stages of World War II (the deportees gradually returned between 1945 and 1952). In contrast to the first deportation, this time, the destination was the Bărăgan Plain, an underdeveloped, sparsely populated area. In a sense, the operation also served as a means of colonizing the region.

The plans allegedly involved, as was later discovered in a document written in Timișoara in 1956, the "purification of the Banat": the ethnic cleansing of Banat Germans, Banat Serbs, Banat Croats and Banat Bulgarians. Additionally, the plans involved the expulsion of members of several social categories considered dangerous by the Romanian Communist Party. Among the targets were farmers with large holdings (known as chiaburi, and roughly equivalent to the Soviet kulaks), wealthy landowners, industrialists, innkeepers and restaurant owners, Bessarabian and Macedonian refugees, former members of the Wehrmacht, foreign citizens, relatives of the refugees, Titoist sympathizers, wartime collaborators of Nazi Germany (see Romania during World War II), Romanian Army employees, fired civil servants, relatives of counter-revolutionaries and all who had supported them, political and civic rights activists, former businessmen with Western ties, and leaders of the ethnic German community.

Events

During the night of June 18, 1951, the third-largest mass deportation in modern Romanian history took place, surpassed only by the World War II deportation of Jews to Transnistria (considered collectively, and ended with massive extermination), and the January 1945 deportation of ethnic Germans from Romania. 40,000 people were taken from their homes and deported to the Bărăgan. These included Romanians, Germans (mostly Banat Swabians), Serbs, Bulgarians, Banat Czechs, and some Ukrainian refugees from Bessarabia and Northern Bukovina, Aromanians, rich peasants, former landlords, bourgeoisie, convicted criminals and Nazi collaborators. Of the roughly 40,000 people who were deported from Banat, 629 people died in the Bărăgan Plain.

The deportees were taken under military guard and left to build houses of mud or adobe on their own in eighteen localities. In 1956, a change in government policy meant that the majority of deportees returned home, but some chose to stay permanently in the Bărăgan Plain.

References

Elena Spijavca, Munci și zile în Bărăgan (Works and Days on the Bărăgan), 2004, Editura Fundația Academică Civică, 
Rafael Mirciov, Lagărul deportării - Pagini din lagărul Bărăganului (The Deportations Camps - Pages from the Bărăgan Camp)
Silvestru Ștevin, Desculț prin propriul destin (Barefoot through My Own Destiny), Editura Mirton, Timișoara, 2002
Silviu Sarafolean, Deportaţii în Bărăgan 1951-1956 (The Bărăgan Deportations, 1951-1956)
Viorel Marineasa, Daniel Vighi, Rusalii ’51 - fragmente din deportarea în Bărăgan (Pentecost '51 - Fragments from the Bărăgan Deportations)
Viorel Marineasa, Daniel Vighi, Valentin Sămînță, Deportarea în Bărăgan -  Destine, documente, reportaje (The Bărăgan Deportations - Destinies, Documents, Reportages)

External links
  Association of Former Bărăgan Deportees - Timișoara
 
 
 
 
 
  Map of the Romanian Gulag (pdf)
  Donauschwaben Villages Helping Hands - Deportation to the Baragan
 

Socialist Republic of Romania
Deportation
1951 in Romania
Legal history of Romania
Ethnic cleansing in Europe
History of Muntenia